Babar Naeem (born 1 January 1983) is a former Pakistani cricketer who played first-class cricket for Rawalpindi from 1999–2000 to 2015–16.

His highest score was 227, which he made in the second innings against Lahore Blues in 2001–02, after scoring 62 in the first innings. He captained Attock Group in 2006–07, and captained Rawalpindi from 2010–11 to 2015–16. He led Rawalpindi to victory in the final of the Quaid-e-Azam Trophy in 2013–14.

References

External links
 
 Babar Naeem at CricketArchive

1983 births
Living people
Pakistani cricketers
Attock Group cricketers
Rawalpindi cricketers
Pakistan Telecommunication Company Limited cricketers
Cricketers from Rawalpindi